La Pêche (Standard Quebec , colloquially ; "The Peach") is a municipality along both sides of the Gatineau River in Les Collines-de-l'Outaouais Regional County Municipality in the Outaouais region of Quebec, Canada, about  north of downtown Gatineau.

Bordering on the north side of the Gatineau Park, La Pêche provides multiple access points to this park.

La Pêche was declared Quebec's first and Canada's second fair trade town on November 9, 2007.

Communities

It includes the following villages and communities:
Duclos
East Aldfield
Edelweiss
Farrellton
Lac-des-Loups (Wolf Lake)
Lascelles, Rupert and Alcove
Sainte-Cécile-de-Masham
Saint-François-de-Masham
Saint-Louis-de-Masham
Wakefield

History
The geographic townships of Aldfield, Masham, and Wakefield were already plotted on the Gale and Duberger Map of 1795, all named after places in Yorkshire, England. Around 1825, logging began in the area, while European settlement began around 1847 with the arrival of large number of people of York County in England.

La Pêche was formed in 1975 through the merger of the township municipalities of Wakefield and Aldfield, the village of Wakefield, and the municipality of Sainte-Cécile-de-Masham. It was named after La Pêche Lake and La Pêche River.

Demographics

Mother tongue:
 English as first language: 36.8%
 French as first language: 58.0%
 English and French as first language: 1.8%
 Other as first language: 2.6%

References

External links

 Municipality of La Pêche

Municipalities in Quebec
Incorporated places in Outaouais